The United States Air Force's 694th Intelligence, Surveillance and Reconnaissance Group (694 ISRG) is an intelligence unit located at Osan AB, Korea.

Mission

The mission of the 694th ISRG is to provide continuous armistice indications and warnings, as well as intelligence, surveillance and reconnaissance operations in support of the Republic of Korea.

History

Previous designations
694th Intelligence, Surveillance and Reconnaissance Group (1 Jan 2009 – present)
694th Intelligence Group (1 Oct 1993 – 1 May 2005; 1 Apr 2008-1 Jan 2009)
694th Intelligence Wing (1 Apr 1992 – 1 Oct 1993)
694th Electronic Security Wing (21 Jun 1988 – 1 Apr 1992)

Assignments

Major Command/Field Operating Agency
25th Air Force (29 Sep 2014 - present)
Air Force Intelligence, Surveillance and Reconnaissance Agency (1 Apr 2008 – 29 Sep 2014)
Air Intelligence Agency (1 Oct 1993 – 1 May 2005)
Air Force Intelligence Command (1 Oct 1991 – 1 Oct 1993)
Electronic Security Command (21 Jun 1988 – 1 Oct 1991)

Wings/Groups
480th Intelligence, Surveillance and Reconnaissance Wing (15 Jul 2008 – present)
70th Intelligence Wing (16 Aug 2000 – 1 May 2005; 1 Apr 2008–15 Jul 2008)
67th Intelligence Wing (1 Oct 1993 – 16 Aug 2000)
Continental Electronic Security Division, (15 Jul 1988 – 1 Oct 1991)

Squadrons assigned
6th Intelligence Squadron – Osan AB, Korea (?-Present)
303d Intelligence Squadron – Osan AB, Korea (?-Present)

Bases stationed
Osan AB, Korea (1 Apr 2008 – present)
Ft George G. Meade, Maryland (1 Oct 1991 – 1 May 2005)
Kelly AFB, Texas (15 Jul 1988 – 1 Oct 1991)

Decorations
Air Force Outstanding Unit Award 
1 Jun 2001–31 May 2003 (with Combat "Valor" device)
1 Oct 1999–30 Sep 2000
1 Oct 1996–30 Sep 1998
1 Oct 1994–30 Sep 1995
1 Oct 1993–30 Sep 1994

References

External links
 Air Force Historical Research Agency: 694th Intelligence, Surveillance and Reconnaissance Group
 USAF Freedom of Information Act Electronic Reading Room: 694th ISR Group emblem
 USAF Freedom of Information Act Electronic Reading Room: 694th ISR Group Lineage and Honors
51st Fighter Wing Public Affairs: Osan Air Base, Korea

Intelligence groups of the United States Air Force